Loei is a town in northeast Thailand.

Loei may also refer to:

Loei Airport
Loei City F.C., a Thai semi-professional football club
Loei province
Loei River